The Classified Forest, the Madarounfa Lake and the Tombs of the 99 saints are located in the Madarounfa Department, Maradi Region, of Niger.

Site description 
The site consists of three primary features:
  The Madarounfa Fores – Beginning 1 km north of the lake, it covers an area of 830 hectares and forms a unique landscape of trees and flowers.
  The Madarounfa Lake – Covers 800 hectares and creates a home for many species of birds.
  The Tombs of 99 Saints – Surround the lake and are the site of ritual by local people.

World Heritage Status 
This site was added to the UNESCO World Heritage Tentative List on  May 26, 2006 in the Mixed (Cultural + Natural) category.

Notes

References 
La forêt classée, le lac de Madarounfa et les tombeaux des 99 saints – UNESCO World Heritage Centre Retrieved 2009-03-03.

Nigerien culture
World Heritage Tentative List for Niger
Maradi Region